Tolhuin Lago Fagnano Airport is a public use airport located  northeast of Tolhuin, a lakeside village in the Tierra del Fuego Province of Argentina.

See also

Transport in Argentina
List of airports in Argentina

References

External links 
OpenStreetMap - Lago Fagnano North Airport
OurAirports - Tolwin Observatory Airport
FallingRain - Tolwin Observatory Airport

Airports in Argentina
Buildings and structures in Tierra del Fuego Province, Argentina